Lempholemma is a genus of fungi within the family Lichinaceae. The genus contains about 33 species.

Species
Lempholemma botryosum
Lempholemma chalazanum
Lempholemma cladodes
Lempholemma compactum
Lempholemma corticola
Lempholemma degelianum
Lempholemma elveloideum
Lempholemma intricatum
Lempholemma lingulatum
Lempholemma polyanthes
Lempholemma polycarpum
Lempholemma radiatum
Lempholemma socotranum

References

Lichinomycetes
Lichen genera
Taxa named by Gustav Wilhelm Körber